Tantrums & Tiaras is a 1997 documentary film about the private life of English musician Elton John, directed by his husband, David Furnish. It was recorded during John's Made in England Tour in 1995 and includes parts of interviews and concerts. Included in the documentary is a large part of a concert John performed in Rio de Janeiro, Brazil in November 1995.

In 1998, the documentary won a Chris Award at the Columbus Film and Video Festival. It was also re-released as a "Director's Cut" in 1997, and then on DVD in November 2008 with extra material.

References

External links
 

Documentary films about singers
British television documentaries
Elton John
1997 films
1997 documentary films
Rocket Pictures films
1990s English-language films
1990s British films